Elachista nedaella is a moth of the family Elachistidae. It is found on Crete.

References

nedaella
Moths described in 1985
Moths of Europe